John Daniel Caine is a United States Air Force lieutenant general who has served as the associate director for military affairs of the Central Intelligence Agency since November 3, 2021. He most recently served as the director of Special Access Program Central Office of the Office of the Under Secretary of Defense for Acquisition and Sustainment from September 2019 to August 2021. Previously, he was the deputy commanding general of the Special Operations Joint Task Force – Operation Inherent Resolve.

Caine is a 1990 graduate of the Virginia Military Institute with a B.A. degree in economics. He later earned an M.A. degree in air warfare from the American Military University in 2005.

In October 2021, Caine was nominated for promotion to lieutenant general.

References

Year of birth missing (living people)
Living people
Place of birth missing (living people)
Virginia Military Institute alumni
United States Air Force personnel of the Iraq War
Recipients of the Distinguished Flying Cross (United States)
United States Air Force generals
Recipients of the Defense Superior Service Medal